The Golden Hits of Billy Eckstine is a 1963 studio album by the American singer Billy Eckstine. It was arranged by Billy Byers, conducted by Bobby Tucker, and produced by Quincy Jones.

Reception

The Negro Digest positively reviewed the album in their September 1963 issue describing it as "a superb album altogether" and that the liner notes of the album were "understated" in their description of Eckstine as "luxurious" and having a "strong sensual undercurrent". The Negro Digest also wondered if Eckstine ever "sang this well at the height of his popularity" from 1948 to 1953.

Track listing 
 "Caravan" (Duke Ellington, Irving Mills, Juan Tizol) – 2:40
 "I Apologize" (Al Goodhart, Al Hoffman, Ed Nelson) – 3:00
 "Somehow" (Mort Maser) – 3:42
 "Blue Moon" (Lorenz Hart, Richard Rodgers) – 2:52
 "Prisoner of Love" (Clarence Gaskill, Leo Robin, Russ Columbo) – 3:03
 "My Foolish Heart" (Ned Washington, Victor Young) – 3:18
 "Everything I Have Is Yours" (Burton Lane, Harold Adamson) – 2:56
 "My Destiny" (Jerry Livingston, Mack David) – 2:45
 "I'm Falling For You" (Clarence Williams, George Sanders, Joe "Trafalgar" Hubert) – 2:37
 "Coquette" (Carmen Lombardo, Gus Kahn, Johnny Green) – 2:38
 "No Orchids For My Lady" (Alan Stranks, Jack Strachey) – 3:09
 "Bewildered" (Leonard Whitcup, Teddy Powell) – 3:12

Personnel 
 Billy Eckstine - vocals
 Billy Byers - arranger
 Bobby Tucker - conductor
 Unidentified orchestra
 Quincy Jones - producer

References

1963 albums
Albums arranged by Billy Byers
Albums produced by Quincy Jones
Billy Eckstine albums
Mercury Records albums